Božidar Čačić (born 28 June 1972) is a Croatian retired football defender.

Club career
He spent most of his professional career playing in Croatia's Prva HNL and in Slovenia's Prva Liga.  He also spent  one year in Australia, playing for Sydney United. He retired from professional football in 2004, after playing with Ljubljana.

References

1972 births
Living people
Sportspeople from Zadar
Association football defenders
Croatian footballers
NK Hrvatski Dragovoljac players
HNK Rijeka players
Sydney United 58 FC players
NK Ljubljana players
Croatian Football League players
National Soccer League (Australia) players
Slovenian PrvaLiga players
Croatian expatriate footballers
Expatriate soccer players in Australia
Croatian expatriate sportspeople in Australia
Expatriate footballers in Slovenia
Croatian expatriate sportspeople in Slovenia
HNK Rijeka non-playing staff